KOUL (107.7 FM) is a terrestrial FM radio station, broadcasting a Tejano music format. It is licensed to Agua Dulce, Texas, United States, and serves the Corpus Christi area.  The station is owned by Minerva R. Lopez, and where KOUL's rimshot signal is weak it used to broadcast on K277BL 103.3 Corpus Christi, an FM translator that went to broadcasting KSIX when KOUL stopped with its previous Shuffle identity.

History
On June 22, 2017 KOUL changed their format from country to contemporary hit radio, branded as "Power 103.3" (switching its translator to K277BL 103.3 FM Corpus Christi).

On March 8, 2018 KOUL changed their format from contemporary hit radio to variety hits, branded as "Shuffle 103.3".
However, Shuffle was short-lived, as just a couple months later KOUL stopped using 103.3 (103.3 went to broadcasting KSIX 1230, which is co-owned with 103.3), while KOUL flipped to a Super Q 104.9 rebroadcast or something similar. Super Q 104.9, KMIQ is co-owned with KOUL.

References

External links

OUL
Radio stations established in 2006
2006 establishments in Texas